Milorad Nedeljković (3 December 1883, Knjaževac, Kingdom of Serbia – 1961, France) was a Serbian economist and Axis-collaborating politician.

He graduated and got his Ph.D. from the University of Belgrade Faculty of Economics. He was a professor of national economics and finance at the Subotica Law School.

Nedeljković is best known for being part of Milan Nedić's German-collaborationist government (Government of National Salvation) during World War II as a minister. When the regime was brought down by the Yugoslav Partisans, Nedeljković left the country and while in exile would die. His brother Petar Nedeljković was a general in the Royal Yugoslav Army.

Works 

1907 Zaštita seoskog poseda 
1909 Istorija srpskih državnih dugova 
1921 Osnovi političke ekonomije
1923 Nauka o finansijama 
1923 Ekonomsko-finansijska studija o državi - teorija činilaca proizvodnje, teorija poreza 
1929 Naš valutni problem 
1933 Ekonomski i pravni problem uloga na štednju 
1933 Pogled na današnju krizu i njeno rešenje

1883 births
1961 deaths
People from Knjaževac
People from the Kingdom of Serbia
Government ministers of Serbia
Serbian economists
Serbia under German occupation
University of Belgrade Faculty of Economics alumni
Serbian collaborators with Nazi Germany
Yugoslav emigrants to France